Vorsetuzumab mafodotin (SGN-75) is an antibody-drug conjugate (ADC) directed to the protein CD70 designed for the treatment of cancer. It is a humanized monoclonal antibody, vorsetuzumab, conjugated with noncleavable monomethyl auristatin F (MMAF), a cytotoxic agent.

This drug was developed by Seattle Genetics, Inc. The drug completed phase I clinical trials for renal cell carcinoma, but development was discontinued in 2013.
No reason was given but SG plan to start clinical trials of SGN-CD70A in 2014.

References 

Monoclonal antibodies for tumors
Antibody-drug conjugates
Experimental cancer drugs